HPG may refer to:

 Huppuguda railway station, in Hyderabad, India
 Hypothalamic–pituitary–gonadal axis
 People's Defence Forces, the armed wing of the Kurdistan Workers' Party
 Shennongjia Hongping Airport, in Hubei, China
 Highway Patrol Group of the Philippine National Police